Austin H. MacCormick (April 20, 1893 - 1979) was an American criminologist and prison reformer. In 1916 he received the Masters of Arts degree from Columbia University Teachers College.  He served in the U.S. Naval reserve from 1917 to 1921. His senior officer at Portsmouth was Thomas Mott Osborne, a penologist who later employed MacCormick. In 1929 he was appointed Assistant Superintendent of the Federal Prisons in the Department of Justice.  In 1930, the Federal Bureau of Prisons was established and MacCormick was named Assistant Director.  From 1934 to 1940 he served as Commissioner of the New York Department of Corrections.  In 1939 he was President of the American Correctional Association. MacCormick was special assistant to the Undersecretary of War from 1944 to 1947. From 1951 to 1960 MacCormick was professor of criminology at UC Berkeley in California.  
   
When he retired from teaching at Berkeley, MacCormick worked full time as the executive director of the Osborne Association until his death in 1979. 

In 1971, MacCormick served as co-chairman of the Goldman Panel, which was charge with conducting an impartial investigation of how Attica Prison inmates were being treated after the retaking of the facility following the uprising at the prison that resulted in a massacre of inmates and hostages by New York state troopers. MacCormick wrote a personal letter to Gov. Nelson Rockefeller, who had ordered the retaking of the prison by armed force, praising Rockefeller for his handling of the crisis. The Goldman Panel publicly reported that inmates were being well-treated, when, in fact, rampant abuse of inmates continuing well after the retaking had been reported to the panel by physicians.

MacCormick was influential in federal and state prison reform and worked with adult and juvenile prisons throughout the nation to help guide penology into the modern era.  He served on committees concerned with alcoholism and drug use and wrote many papers expressing progressive ideas on prison reform, libraries, and juvenile delinquency. MacCormick influenced the field of criminology with his ideas, practices, and suggested improvements.

MacCormick wrote a book based on the results of his 1928 nationwide survey of prison education, (later published in 1931 as a book entitled The Education of Adult Prisoners: A Survey and a Program Prepared for the National Society of Penal Information 456 pages). MacCormick was influenced by Thomas Mott Osborne as evidenced by the dedication of his book.

In his book, The Education of Adult Prisoners it lists  for prison education:

 Fundamental academic education, designed to provide the intellectual tools needed in study and training in his everyday life.
 Vocational education, designed to give training for an occupation.
 Health education, designed to teach the fundamentals of personal and community healthy.
 Cultural education, embracing the non-utilitarian fields one enters for intellectual or aesthetic satisfaction alone. 
 Social education, to which all other types of education and all the activities of the institution should contribute.

He summarizes his book by stating: "The typical prisoner is a young man or woman who needs education." He devotes a chapter to "Individualization of Education".

References

Prison reformers
Penologists
American prison officers
1893 births
1979 deaths
Teachers College, Columbia University alumni
United States Navy reservists
Federal Bureau of Prisons officials
20th-century American non-fiction writers
Place of birth missing
University of California, Berkeley faculty
Date of death missing